45th Regiment Massachusetts Volunteer Infantry was an infantry regiment in the Union army during the American Civil War. The regiment trained at Camp Meigs in Readville, Massachusetts before traveling to North Carolina, where they fought in the Battle of Kinston in December 1862, and in skirmishes in and around New Bern, North Carolina in the spring of 1863. They suffered heavy casualties in battle and due to fever. In June they returned to Boston, where they patrolled the streets to quell any draft riots, and were discharged on July 21. They were commanded by Colonel Charles R. Codman (1829-1918).

Image gallery

See also
 List of Massachusetts Civil War units
 Battle of New Bern (1862)
 Battle of New Bern (1864)
 Massachusetts in the Civil War

Notes

References

External links
Acton Memorial Library Civil War Archives: Forty-Fifth Regiment Massachusetts Volunteer Militia (Infantry) Nine Months
NPS, Battle Unit Details: 45th Regiment, Massachusetts Infantry (Militia)
Civil War Index: 45th Massachusetts Infantry in the Civil War
 Accessible Archives: The Cadet Regiment’s Band

Units and formations of the Union Army from Massachusetts
Military units and formations established in 1862
Military units and formations disestablished in 1863